Mahisa is a small town of the Kheda district of Gujarat, India. The village is home to several schools, including Sharda Primary School and the M P Joshi High School and Library. Mahisha also has a number of temples dedicated to different deities of Hindu. Shree Atmaram Madhi is located in the middle of Murmsagar Lake with all temples surrounding. Mahisa also has a Kshetragni Devi Temple (for Khetai Maa who is kuldevi of Lord Ved Vyasa). It has also been mentioned also in Devi Bhagvat. Mahisa is blessed by Swaminarayan in his Bharat Yatra in the form of Neelkanthvarni. Mahisa is a village of lakes, including, Marmsagar Lake and Utkantheswar Lake. Mahisa has the world's second Temple of Chaturmukhi Bhrahmaji.

Temples 
 Shri Marmsagareshwar Mahadev Temple
 Shri Gayatri Devi Temple
 Shri Kshetragni Mata Temple
 Shri Swaminarayan Temple
 Shree Ramji Temple
 Shree Utkantheswar Mahadev
 Shri Santram Maharaj Temple
 Navdurgha Mata Temple
 Shree Mahakali Temple
 Shree Hanumanji Mandir
 Shree Ganesh Mandir
 Shree Brahmaji Temple
 Baliya Dev Temple
Gogamaharaj Mandir
 Shree Harshiddi Temple
 Bhathiji Templs

Connectivity 
Mahisa is connected through road.Population=200000

References 

Cities and towns in Kheda district